Huichun may refer to:

 Huichún, an archaeological site in Peru
 Fai chun, celebratory sayings as Chinese New Year decorations ("Huichun" in Mandarin)
 Hunchun, a city in Jilin province, China often mispronounced as Huichun
 Huichun (also called Xučyun or Huichin), a name for a grouping of people of the Verona Band of Alameda County, California; includes Muwekma and Chochenyo Ohlone tribes; see 
The ancestral homeland of the aforementioned peoples, including Oakland, California, and the surrounding cities